Jan Jan or Janjan in Iran may refer to:
 Jan Jan, Ilam
 Jan Jan, Kermanshah
 Janjan, alternate name of Deh-e Janjan, Kermanshah Province